Scotinotylus sintalutus is a species of sheet weaver found in Canada. It was described by Millidge in 1981.

References

Linyphiidae
Spiders of Canada
Spiders described in 1981